The Near North District School Board (NNDSB; known as English-language Public District School Board No. 4 prior to 1999) administers public education in an area of Ontario that is includes all of Parry Sound District, plus a northerly portion of Muskoka District and the western portion of Nipissing District. It includes the communities of North Bay, Parry Sound, Mattawa and the Almaguin Highlands.

History
The NNDSB was previously known as the Parry Sound and Area School Board. 

In 2006, three former students filed lawsuits against the NNDSB for the sexual abuse they suffered at the hands of Kenneth Bull, a former teacher of the school board.  Bull taught at Humphrey Public School, where the assaults occurred.  Bull was convicted of five counts of indecent assault against young males in 1978.  The school board was named in the lawsuit for its failure to protect the students.

Schools

There are 34 schools governed by NNDSB, consisting of 27 elementary schools and 7 high schools:

Elementary schools
Alliance Public School – North Bay
Argyle Public School – Port Loring
Britt Public School – Britt
E.T. Carmichael Public School – North Bay
E.W. Norman Public School – North Bay
Evergreen Heights Education Centre – Emsdale (Perry)
Ferris Glen Public School – Corbeil (East Ferris)
Humphrey Public School – Seguin
Land of Lakes Public School - Burk's Falls
M.T. Davidson Public School – Callander
MacTier Public School – MacTier
Magnetawan Central Public School – Magnetawan
Mapleridge Public School – Powassan
Mattawa District Public School – Mattawa
McDougall Public School – McDougall (Parry Sound)
Nobel Public School – Nobel
Parry Sound Public School – Parry Sound
Phelps Central Public School – Redbridge
Silver Birches Public School – North Bay
South River Public School – South River
South Shore Education Centre – Nipissing
Sundridge Centennial Public School – Sundridge
Sunset Park Public School – North Bay
Vincent Massey Public School – North Bay
White Woods Public School – Sturgeon Falls (West Nipissing)
Whitestone Lake Central School - Dunchurch
Woodland Public School - North Bay

Secondary Schools/Alternative Learning Centres
Almaguin Highlands Secondary School - South River (Strong)
Chippewa Secondary School - North Bay
F.J. McElligott Secondary School - Mattawa
Laurentian Learning Centre (formerly the Nipissing Alternative School) - North Bay
Northern Secondary School - Sturgeon Falls
Parry Sound High School - Parry Sound
West Ferris Secondary School - North Bay

See also

List of school districts in Ontario
List of high schools in Ontario

References

External links
 Near North District School Board

School districts in Ontario